Simon John Burman (born 26 November 1965) is an English former footballer who played as a midfielder or as a winger in the Football League for Colchester United.

Career

Born in Ipswich, Burman began his career with Colchester United, signing on professional terms after coming through the club's youth system. He made his debut on 29 March 1985 in a 2–1 win against Tranmere Rovers, and scored his first goal for the club in a 2–2 away draw at Exeter City on 8 March 1986. He was never able to establish himself as a first-team regular, appearing 32 times in three seasons. His final game came in a 0–0 draw with Leyton Orient at Layer Road on 7 November 1986 before leaving to join Weymouth.

References

1965 births
Living people
Sportspeople from Ipswich
English footballers
Association football wingers
Colchester United F.C. players
Weymouth F.C. players
English Football League players